Pandimukkala Venkata Vara Lakshmi, better known as P. V. V. Lakshmi, is an eight-time Indian national champion in badminton and represented India in the 1996 Atlanta Olympics. She is also the wife of Pullela Gopichand. She was the bronze medalist in badminton at the 1998 Commonwealth Games in the Women's Team event.

Gopichand Badminton Academy
P. V. V. Lakshmi, was very supportive of Gopichand during the formation of Gopichand Badminton Academy and even contributed to the effort of securing monetary support. Despite other donations, Gopichand could only gather US$1.75 million. It was then they decided to mortgage his family home and raise the remaining money for the already delayed project. In 2008, the facility was eventually completed at the cost of $2.5 million. Immediately after the construction, the Government of India sent the Commonwealth Games team to train at this facility. The government increased the daily rate they pay per player to $20 for this special Games camp. This was a big jump from the $5 daily fee per player that the government had previously paid for other training camps.

In 2008, they appealed to Bollywood, the Hindi cinema industry to become badminton's brand ambassador. They felt that by having a popular cinema icon supporting the sport will help popularize it.

Despite Saina Nehwal's success in international tournaments, Gopichand and Lakshmi found it hard to run the Academy. To run it at an optimal level, it requires $300,000 a year. As of 2010, he was making do with $100,000 to pay the training cost for 60 players and was holding off hiring more coaches.

Achievements

IBF International

Personal life
P. V. V. Lakshmi married fellow badminton player Gopichand on 5 June 2002. They have two children, a daughter named Gayathri and a son named Vishnu. Her daughter Gayathri, who is the elder of the two siblings, won the 2015 U-13 National Badminton Champion. Her son Vishnu is currently training at Gopichand academy. After marriage, Gopichand concentrated on badminton academy and Lakshmi helped him.

References

External links
 

Living people
Indian female badminton players
Olympic badminton players of India
Badminton players at the 1996 Summer Olympics
Sportswomen from Vijayawada, India
Racket sportspeople from Vijayawada
Sportswomen from Hyderabad, India
Indian national badminton champions
Commonwealth Games medallists in badminton
Commonwealth Games bronze medallists for India
20th-century Indian women
20th-century Indian people
Badminton players at the 1998 Commonwealth Games
1974 births
Medallists at the 1998 Commonwealth Games